Tokenomics, also known as token economics, is the study of parameters that determine the characteristics of cryptocurrencies (cryptos) or cryptographic tokens to create economic value. Both cryptocurrency and tokens are the subclasses of digital assets that use the technology of cryptography. Crypto is the native currency of a blockchain, and it is developed directly by the blockchain protocol. Tokens are created through a blockchain-based organization or application. For example, Ether (ETH) is the native crypto of Ethereum, while Axie Infinity Shards (AXS), the governance tokens of the game Axie Infinity, lives on Ethereum, and users can use them to play games. In both cases, tokenomics acts as an incentive mechanism and monetary policy of the supply and demand of certain crypto or token. Tokenomics rules how and when a new crypto or token should be generated or removed from the system. Once the tokenomics is written into a smart contract, the system is automated.

In the real-world economics system, the economy is subject to fluctuations like inflation and deflation. Central banks intervene through monetary policies. Tokenonomics can be thought of as an approach to implementing monetary policies and economic rules via automated smart contracts. On the blockchain, different projects may issue their own tokens with different tokenomics to complete their ecosystem for various purposes, such as fundraising and governance. Some common tokenomics models include the deflationary model, inflationary model, and dual-token model. For instance, before the very last Bitcoin is added to the Bitcoin pool, it is inflationary because as miners (people who find Bitcoin by using algorithms to solve mathematical puzzles) keep mining Bitcoins, the amount of Bitcoins increases and the purchasing power of each Bitcoin decrease. However, the tokenomics of Bitcoin has multiple mechanisms to lower the rate of inflation, such as making mathematical puzzles harder and harder to solve and allowing fewer and fewer miners to receive the coin.

Creation of tokens and token types 
Companies may create their own tokens for economic and structural reasons. Tokens are created to encourage the holder to interact and empower the product by automatically distributing the rewards to their stakeholders. Projects may use tokens to raise funds from the public and for proof of internal operation (e.g. game tokens and governance tokens for the right to vote). To achieve the purposes and function of the tokens created, a fine tokenomics structure is needed.

Security tokens for fundraising 
In traditional capital markets, if a company wants to raise funds from the public, it must go through an initial public offering (IPO), which may take years, costing anywhere from $4 to $28 million in fees, depending on its size. In the early stages, only accredited investors are allowed to enter an investment, such as a venture capital. In the decentralized, automated world, with lower cost, tokens can be created by anyone, with fundamental parameters and functions described by tokenomics. Instead of equities, blockchain companies raise funds through the issuing of tokens in the process of initial coin offerings. The security tokens can be thought of as equity shares of the blockchain companies. After issuing the tokens, individual investors are allowed to buy tokens and own shares. For investors, they can become early contributors to gain returns along with the growth of the company. Web 3.0 investors can sell their holdings of tokens after the vesting period.

Utility tokens for internal use 
Utility tokens are used as proof to access a company's service or product. Unlike security tokens, utility tokens are for exchange and securing the liquidity and value of the company. Utility tokens are an in-ecosystem currency. For example, with a token named Smooth Love Potion (SLP) in the game Axie Infinity, players can use it to breed desired spirits. In this case, SLP acts as the internal currency within the game. Users earn SLP from tasks, and spend SLP to defeat opponents.

Risk 
Investors risk being "rugged," meaning that the token issuer may "raise money and disappear," resulting in a value loss in those tokens and a capital loss for investors. Hackers may hack into the system and steal the tokens. Each tokenomics model has its disadvantages and advantages.

See also 
 Cryptoeconomics

References 

Wikipedia Student Program
Cryptocurrencies